Ambassador Mary Seymour Olmsted (September 28, 1919 Duluth, Minnesota - July 13, 2018 Bowie, Maryland) was the first female U.S. Ambassador to a Pacific Islands nation and was the first American Ambassador in Papua New Guinea (1975-1979). Gerald Ford appointed her to establish the embassy which was formally opened in September 1975.  In 1978, Jimmy Carter appointed her to serve concurrently as Ambassador to the Solomon Islands.

She grew up in Titusville, Florida.  Olmsted joined the Foreign Service after receiving her B.A. from Mount Holyoke College (major in Economics) in 1941 and her M.A. from Columbia University in 1945. Olmsted went to school at night, working during the day at Central Hanover Bank and Trust Company in the security analysis division. She went on to work at the National Bureau of Economic Research for a couple of years. She studied at the Fletcher School of Law and Diplomacy for a year, once she started working at the State Department, but left before attaining a degree. Olmsted established Endowed Fellowship at the University of Hawaii specifically for students from Papua New Guinea.

In 2011, she was one of several to win the National Women's Political Caucus “Women of Courage” Award in recognition of being the first president of the Women's Action Organization (WAO) of the State Department.

Olmsted died from complications from dementia at her home in a retirement community.

References

American women ambassadors
Mount Holyoke College alumni
Columbia University alumni
People from Duluth, Minnesota
People from Titusville, Florida
People from Bowie, Maryland
Ambassadors of the United States to Papua New Guinea
Ambassadors of the United States to the Solomon Islands
American women economists
The Fletcher School at Tufts University alumni
1919 births
2018 deaths
20th-century American diplomats
20th-century American women
21st-century American women